Roen is a mountain of the Nonsberg group.

Roen may also refer to:

People 
 Roen (surname)
 Røen, a surname
 Roen Nelson (born 1980), Jamaican footballer